By-elections to the 7th Moscow City Duma are held to fill vacancies in the Russian regional parliament between the 2019 election and the 2024 election.

According to article 82 of the Moscow Electoral Code, by-elections are appointed by the Moscow Electoral Commission. By-elections are not appointed and are not held if, as a result of these elections, a Deputy cannot be elected for a term of more than one year before the end of the constitutional term for which the Moscow City Duma was elected. The Federal Law establishes the second Sunday of September (single voting day) as the date for any regional election, including by-elections.

The first by-elections were held on 17–19 September 2021, in two constituencies.

Candidates endorsed by Aleksey Navalny's Smart Voting are marked with a (*) in the list below.

Overview

2021 by-election in Constituency №37
On 16 August 2020 incumbent Deputy and Vice Speaker of the Moscow City Duma Nikolay Gubenko (CPRF) died from heart failure after struggling with illness. Gubenko served in the City Duma since 2005, previously he was a State Duma member (1995-2003) and last Soviet Minister of Culture (1989-1991). In 2019 Nikolay Gubenko was elected in a landslide with 61.65% of the vote with the support from both Aleksey Navalny's Smart Voting and the Government of Moscow.

Moscow City Duma District 37 is located in South-Western Moscow and includes Akademichesky District, Gagarinsky District, Lomonosovsky District and parts of Prospekt Vernadskogo.

Registered candidates
Leonid Afanasyev (Communists of Russia), economist at CJSC "Stroyavtomatika"
Darya Bagina (CPRF), first secretary of LKSM Moscow city committee
Aleksandr Bely (Independent), mass entertainments director at the Centre of Sport and Education "Sambo-70"
Maksim Chirkov (SR-ZP), professor of economics at Moscow State University, former Member of Gagarinsky District Assembly of Deputies (2004-2017)
Yury Dmitriyev (New People), political consultant, former Member of Serpukhov Council of Deputies (2005-2010)
Roman Khudyakov (Independent), former Member of State Duma (2012-2016)
Yury Maksimov (LDPR), professor of economics at Moscow State University
Yekaterina Razzakova (United Russia), community activist, chief accountant at JSC "Il' De Bote"
Vladimir Ryzhkov (Yabloko), former Member of State Duma (1993-2007)

Failed to qualify
Yelena Rusakova (Independent), Head of Gagarinsky District, 2018 mayoral candidate in Yabloko primary
Grigory Tolkachev (Independent), Member of Gagarinsky District Assembly of Deputies

Withdrew
Danil Degtyarev (Independent), individual entrepreneur
Iosif Dzhagayev (Independent), aide to chairman of Civic Initiative North Ossetia regional office
Aleksandr Mayshev (Independent), individual entrepreneur
Aleksandr Meshcheryakov (Independent), homemaker
Igor Semenovsky (Independent), aide to State Duma member Sergey Ten
Ilya Yashin (Independent), Head of Krasnoselsky District, 2018 mayoral candidate

Results

|-
! colspan=2 style="background-color:#E9E9E9;text-align:left;vertical-align:top;" |Candidate
! style="background-color:#E9E9E9;text-align:left;vertical-align:top;" |Party
! style="background-color:#E9E9E9;text-align:right;" |Votes
! style="background-color:#E9E9E9;text-align:right;" |%
|-
|style="background-color:"|
|align=left|Vladimir Ryzhkov
|align=left|Yabloko
|16,623
|21.05%
|-
|style="background-color:"|
|align=left|Darya Bagina*
|align=left|Communist Party
|15,658
|19.83%
|-
|style="background-color:"|
|align=left|Yekaterina Razzakova
|align=left|United Russia
|12,822
|16.24%
|-
|style="background-color:"|
|align=left|Maksim Chirkov
|align=left|A Just Russia — For Truth
|9,274
|11.75%
|-
|style="background-color:"|
|align=left|Yury Maksimov
|align=left|Liberal Democratic Party
|5,553
|7.03%
|-
|style="background-color:"|
|align=left|Yury Dmitriyev
|align=left|New People
|5,200
|6.59%
|-
|style="background-color:"|
|align=left|Roman Khudyakov
|align=left|Independent
|4,580
|5.80%
|-
|style="background-color:"|
|align=left|Aleksandr Bely
|align=left|Independent
|4,561
|5.78%
|-
|style="background:;"| 
|align=left|Leonid Afanasyev
|align=left|Communists of Russia
|2,849
|3.61%
|-
| colspan="5" style="background-color:#E9E9E9;"|
|- style="font-weight:bold"
| colspan="3" style="text-align:left;" | Total
| 78,958
| 100%
|-
| colspan="5" style="background-color:#E9E9E9;"|
|- style="font-weight:bold"
| colspan="4" |Source:
|
|}

2021 by-election in Constituency №19
In August 2020 incumbent Deputy Oleg Sheremetyev (CPRF) was arrested on charges of fraud, he allegedly claimed for personal uses money intended for his aide. In October 2020 Shermetyev was found guilty and sentenced for 4 years probation, his status of Moscow City Duma deputy as the result was suspended. Oleg Sheremetyev won in 2019 with 42.11% of the vote, defeating Constituency №18 incumbent Deputy Irina Nazarova (My Moscow)  with the support of Smart Voting.

Moscow City Duma District 19 is located in Eastern Moscow and includes Novogireyevo, parts of Ivanovskoye and Veshnyaki.

Registered candidates
Vadim Aleksandrov (ZA!), unemployed
Mikhail Butrimov (Independent), former chairman of Russian All-People's Union regional office (2019-2021)
Georgy Fedorov (SR-ZP), former Member of Civic Chamber of the Russian Federation (2011-2016)
Pyotr Karmanov (Independent), aide to Moscow City Duma member Darya Besedina
Yelena Kats (United Russia), chief doctor of Children's City Polyclinic №7, Member of Veshnyaki Council of Deputies
Andrey Lapin (RPPSS), professor of public administration at Russian Presidential Academy of National Economy and Public Administration
Maksim Lapshin (CPRF), foreman of construction and assembly department 1 at LLP "Engineering company MRES"
Sergey Medvedev (Independent), technician at LLP "Promstart"
Mikhail Monakhov (LDPR), coordinator of the LDPR Moscow city office, aide to Senator Aleksandr Pronyushkin of Vladimir Oblast
Mikhail Ochkin (Independent), anticorruption activist, perennial candidate
Ilya Ostrovsky (New People), aide to chairman of "People Against Corruption" political party
Vladislav Romashko (Independent), unemployed
Nikolay Sheremetyev (Communists of Russia), general director of LLP "ListRezerv"

Withdrew
Antonina Smirnova (Independent), pensioner

Results

|-
! colspan=2 style="background-color:#E9E9E9;text-align:left;vertical-align:top;" |Candidate
! style="background-color:#E9E9E9;text-align:left;vertical-align:top;" |Party
! style="background-color:#E9E9E9;text-align:right;" |Votes
! style="background-color:#E9E9E9;text-align:right;" |%
|-
|style="background-color:"|
|align=left|Yelena Kats
|align=left|United Russia
|24,407
|33.95%
|-
|style="background-color:"|
|align=left|Pyotr Karmanov
|align=left|Independent
|14,662
|20.40%
|-
|style="background-color:"|
|align=left|Maksim Lapshin*
|align=left|Communist Party
|6,900
|9.60%
|-
|style="background-color:"|
|align=left|Georgy Fedorov
|align=left|A Just Russia — For Truth
|5,595
|7.78%
|-
|style="background-color:"|
|align=left|Andrey Lapin
|align=left|Party of Pensioners
|4,144
|5.76%
|-
|style="background:;"| 
|align=left|Nikolay Sheremetyev
|align=left|Communists of Russia
|3,696
|5.14%
|-
|style="background-color:"|
|align=left|Mikhail Butrimov
|align=left|Independent
|2,589
|3.60%
|-
|style="background-color:"|
|align=left|Mikhail Monakhov
|align=left|Liberal Democratic Party
|2,571
|3.58%
|-
|style="background-color:"|
|align=left|Ilya Ostrovsky
|align=left|New People
|2,273
|3.16%
|-
|style="background-color:"|
|align=left|Vadim Aleksandrov
|align=left|Green Alternative
|1,455
|2.02%
|-
|style="background-color:"|
|align=left|Sergey Medvedev
|align=left|Independent
|1,229
|1.71%
|-
|style="background-color:"|
|align=left|Vladislav Romashko
|align=left|Independent
|287
|0.40%
|-
|style="background-color:"|
|align=left|Mikhail Ochkin
|align=left|Independent
|285
|0.40%
|-
| colspan="5" style="background-color:#E9E9E9;"|
|- style="font-weight:bold"
| colspan="3" style="text-align:left;" | Total
| 71,885
| 100%
|-
| colspan="5" style="background-color:#E9E9E9;"|
|- style="font-weight:bold"
| colspan="4" |Source:
|
|}

References 

 7
Legislative elections in Moscow
Politics of Moscow